
Gmina Łęki Szlacheckie is a rural gmina (administrative district) in Piotrków County, Łódź Voivodeship, in central Poland.

Villages
Gmina Łęki Szlacheckie contains the villages and settlements of Adamów, Antonielów, Bęczkowice, Cieśle, Dąbrowa, Dobrenice, Dobreniczki, Dorszyn, Felicja, Górale, Huta, Ignaców Szlachecki, Janów, Kolonia Tomawa, Kolonia Trzepnica, Kolonia Żerechowa, Kuźnica Żerechowska, Łęki Szlacheckie, Lesiopole, Niwy, Ogrodzona, Olszyny, Piwaki, Podstole, Reducz, Stanisławów, Teklin, Tomawa, Trzepnica, Wykno and Żerechowa.

Neighbouring gminas
Gmina Łęki Szlacheckie is bordered by the gminas of Gorzkowice, Masłowice, Ręczno and Rozprza.

References
Polish official population figures 2006

Leki Szlacheckie
Piotrków County